"Fears of a Clown" is the fourteenth episode of the twenty-ninth season of the American animated television series The Simpsons, and the 632nd episode of the series overall. It aired in the United States on Fox on April 1, 2018.

Plot
Principal Skinner tells Groundskeeper Willie that he plans to retire, with Martin discovering the secret and telling the entire school. During the final sendoff, Skinner chooses Bart for his final farewell, who attempts to shoot him in the head with a rock. However, it is revealed that the retirement was just a ruse so Skinner would finally blow the whistle on Bart after years of being pranked by him. Feeling embarrassed and angry, Bart chooses to pull off the ultimate prank to the entire staff by super-gluing the faces of Skinner and staff with plastic Krusty the Clown masks. Unfortunately, this causes people around Springfield to become terrified of clowns, and also causes Krusty to lose his comedic edge.

Lisa then convinces Krusty to turn into a serious actor, and he takes part in a parody play version of Death of a Salesman, called The Salesman's Bad Day, written by Llewellyn Sinclair (his second appearance since "A Streetcar Named Marge"), which Krusty at first cannot do, until Sinclair motivates him, causing Krusty to become a serious actor until his clown self appears in his mind, telling him that he is still a clown and nothing else.

Meanwhile, Bart is in court and is about to be free with the "boys will be boys" saying, until Marge objects and tells Judge Dowd that what Bart did was terrible and he has a real problem with pranking and suggests that Dowd punish Bart, resulting in him going to a rehab center for almost a month. Although Marge thinks she did a good thing, she begins to question her actions. During a session as Bart places tacks on the doctor's chair, the doctor convinces Marge to come in and sit on his chair, causing Bart to stop the prank and completing one step of his treatment.

After being released, Bart goes to apologize to the people whom he pranked. However, with the encouragement of Willie, Bart plans to pull the ultimate prank, staging a fake apology announcement at the gymnasium where above the crowd is a net full of water balloons. But when he sees Marge in the crowd, he tries to tell people to run away but the weight of the water balloons breaks the net, causing the crowd to get drenched, with Marge finally realizing that the "boys will be boys" saying is real and that motherhood "sucks", followed by Homer saying the same saying and Marge walking into the boys restroom to get even with him.

On the night of the play, Krusty is still being haunted by his former clown self. During the play, as Krusty tries to quiet the voice inside his mind, he causes the audience to laugh. He realizes that he is not a serious actor, but a clown, and starts to do comedic antics.

In the final scene, the play that Krusty was in is later seen being witnessed by the ghosts of Krusty, Arthur Miller, Rabbi Hyman Krustofsky, and William Shakespeare.

Reception
Dennis Perkins of The A.V. Club gave this episode a C−, stating, "Sometimes The Simpsons rolls out an episode that’s so pale an approximation of its best that sticking up for it becomes an exercise in hand-waving and deep, deep sighs. 'Fears Of A Clown' isn’t good. It’s also not bad. It is, instead, irrelevant in its hollow echoes of past, actually memorable, episodes. When the book on 'The Simpsons' is finally closed...and the inevitable all-time episode rankings are compiled, 'Fears Of A Clown' is one of those installments destined to elicit blank stares, even from die-hard fans. It barely exists."

"Fears of a Clown" scored a 0.9 rating with a 4 share and was watched by 2.06 million people, making it Fox's highest rated show of the night.

References

External links
 

2018 American television episodes
The Simpsons (season 29) episodes